Mega, previously known as Megasport, is a television channel in Ukraine, a member of the "Inter" TV-Family. Until 2010, it was known as "Megasport" and positioned itself as a sport channel.

The channel is part of GDF Media Limited, owned by Dmytro Firtash.

References

External links
 Official website

Ukrainian brands
Television stations in Ukraine
Ukrainian-language television stations in Ukraine
Television channels and stations established in 2005